Parje is a small village southeast of Pivka in the Inner Carniola region of Slovenia.

The local church in the settlement is dedicated to Saint Justus and belongs to the Parish of Zagorje.

References

External links

Parje on Geopedia

Populated places in the Municipality of Pivka